in , or  in , is a nearly obsolete Japanese .

The  still sees some modern-day usage.

  is still used in several Okinawan orthographies for the syllable .

Stroke order

The   is made with one stroke. It resembles a   that continues with a double-humped  shape underneath.

The   is made with three strokes: 
 A horizontal line that hooks down and to the left.
 A vertical line, just grazing the end of the first stroke.
 A long horizontal line across the bottom.

Other communicative representations

 Full Braille representation

 Computer encodings

References

See also
U (kana)
E (kana)

Specific kana